Hon Kwok City Center is a skyscraper  in Shenzhen, China. Construction began in 2010 and was completed in 2017. The skyscraper serves as a mixed used building with residential and office space.

See also

List of tallest buildings in Shenzhen
List of tallest buildings in China

References

Skyscrapers in Shenzhen
Buildings and structures under construction in China